Allsorts (later renamed Gigglish Allsorts in 1994) is a British pre-school children's television series that was produced for ITV by Granada Television. The programmes aired from 7 January 1987 to 12 December 1995 and covered a range of children's learning activities.

History
In common with many of ITV's educational children's programmes of the era, Allsorts – first screened in January 1986 – was originally intended to run for only one series while ITV's flagship children's series, Rainbow, was off air that year. The first series ran until July, but despite moderate popularity in its first run, Granada decided not to renew the series and, instead, initially opted in favour of Allsorts predecessor, the pre-school orientated series Our Backyard (which had already been on air since August 1984), largely because the latter could be made more quickly and cheaply. But, after failing to attract enough viewers in its third run in late 1986, Our Backyard was cancelled and Allsorts was brought back for a second series in January 1987 and proved so popular with both pre-schoolers and older children that it was subsequently recommissioned for a further seven series, before it was eventually dropped in 1995.

The series was characterised by its quirky humour, songs and entertaining storylines, which the characters would have to discover, solve or enjoy. It starred Andrew Wightman as Bonzo and Wayne Jackman as Jiffy, who starred in the series throughout its entire run. Wayne and Andrew were originally joined by Vivienne Mckone as 'Natty' and Virginia Radcliffe as 'Spike The Dog'. Natty and Spike were later dropped from the cast and were replaced by Virginia, played by Virginia Radcliffe (who originally portrayed Spike The Dog). By the early 1990s Virginia Radcliffe left the cast and was replaced by Jane Cox as 'JJ'. Puppet characters were later introduced. The first was Box (a talking box) operated by Julie Westwood. Then the final edition to the cast was Moudly The Mole, operated by Robert skidmore who also re built Box and along with Daryl Worby built Mouldy.

The series was renamed Gigglish Allsorts in 1994, with a new set of titles, a new house and new music. However, by this time, viewing figures were on the wane, despite the introduction of a zany Jack In The Box played by Fred Feast and Granada decided that the show had become a shadow of its former self. After a decade-long run, the series was cancelled at the end of its ninth series a year later, in part due to Granada discontinuing many of its lower budget programmes. The final episode was screened on 12 December 1995. Jane Cox later joined Emmerdale and Andrew Wightman became series producer of Granada's Stars in Their Eyes.

Cast
Jiffy – Wayne Jackman (Series 1–9)
Bonzo – Andrew Wightman (Series 1–9)
Natty – Vivienne Mckone  (Series 1–3)
Spike The Dog – Virginia Radcliffe (Series 1–3)
Virginia – Virginia Radcliffe (Series 4)
JJ – Jane Cox (Series 5–9)
Box – Julie Westwood (Series 5–9)
Mouldy – Robert Skidmore (series 7–9)

Format
The show's format changed every series. The titles and the set changed, the characters' clothing changed, and the storylines became a little more complex. In the Gigglish Allsorts era of the series, the characters even ventured out of the house on outings, such as a visit to Gulliver's World in the episode "The Big Day Out" in 1994.

Opening titles
The opening credits from series one to five are fully animated in a cartoonish style. They feature a toy which starts off as a spinning top, then turns into ball, then a jug of water, then a train, then a house which flies into a kite which reads "Allsorts". The music consists of several pieces of instrumentation in sequence, coming in one after the other as the toy changes form.

Series six has the cartoon pictures of series one in three square boxes at the right hand side of the screen, with the opening titles on the left side. The background music is sung by the stars of the show, with each singing a different verse. The lyrics of the song are "Hey, it's an Allsorts day, anything can happen / It's an Allsorts day / Today!"

The opening credits from series seven to nine begins with a close-up of a box made of numerous light-up squares as an unknown voice starts singing. As the lyrics "one – two – three" are sung, the camera pans back, and a box opens which contains objects including toy aeroplanes, cars, teddy bears. Afterwards, JJ, Jiffy, Box and Bonzo appear, pulling faces. The lyrics of the background song are "Hey! Are you ready – steady – one – two – three / Gigglish Allsorts – what's happening today? / Gigglish Allsorts – they're coming out to play."

Transmission guide

Series 1 (1987)
Water (1) - 7 January 1987
Up and Down (1) - 14 January 1987
Collections - 21 January 1987
Big and Little - 28 January 1987
Shoes - 4 February 1987
Hats - 11 February 1987
Hands - 18 February 1987
Sticky Things - 25 February 1987
Same/Different - 4 March 1987
Fruit and Veg - 11 March 1987
Houses and Homes - 18 March 1987
Noises (1) - 25 March 1987
Paper - 1 April 1987
Plants (1) - 8 April 1987
Boxes - 15 April 1987
String and Things - 22 April 1987
Journeys (1) - 29 April 1987
Air (1) - 6 May 1987
Colour - 13 May 1987
Lost and Found - 20 May 1987
Faces - 27 May 1987
Wheels - 3 June 1987
Hot and Cold - 10 June 1987
Pets - 17 June 1987
Dragons - 24 June 1987
Birthdays - 1 July 1987

Series 2 (1988)
Spring - 6 April 1988
Clean and Dirty - 13 April 1988
Magic Orchestra (1) - 20 April 1988
Fair's Fair - 27 April 1988
Games - 4 May 1988
Pictures - 11 May 1988
New Beginnings - 18 May 1988
Going Away Today - 25 May 1988
Jealousy - 1 June 1988
Cafe Allsorts - 8 June 1988
Robots - 15 June 1988
Theatre - 22 June 1988
Appearances - 29 June 1988
Holes - 6 July 1988
Secrets - 13 July 1988
Silliness - 20 July 1988
Magic Orchestra (2) - 27 July 1988
Friends - 3 August 1988
Illness - 10 August 1988
Gallery - 17 August 1988
Happy and Sad - 24 August 1988
Night - 31 August 1988
Favourites - 7 September 1988
Mystery and Magic - 14 September 1988
Promises - 21 September 1988
Greed - 28 September 1988
Treasure - 5 October 1988
Clothes (1) - 12 October 1988
For Sale - 19 October 1988
On My Own - 26 October 1988
Circus - 2 November 1988
Allsorts Book - 9 November 1988
Time - 16 November 1988
Journeys (2) - 23 November 1988
Lost Property - 30 November 1988
Broken and Fixed - 7 December 1988
All Change (1) - 14 December 1988
Naughty Tricks - 21 December 1988

Series 3 (1989-1990)
Cottoning On - 9 August 1989
Floating and Sinking - 16 August 1989
Ten Green Bottles - 23 August 1989
Accidents - 30 August 1989
Hello - 6 September 1989
The Hot Day - 13 September 1989
Collecting - 20 September 1989
Camping (1) - 27 September 1989
Sharing - 4 October 1989
Allsorts TV - 11 October 1989
Flying - 18 October 1989
Plants (2) - 25 October 1989
The Face - 1 November 1989
Magnets - 8 November 1989
Jumble Sale - 15 November 1989
Colours - 22 November 1989
Memory - 29 November 1989
Water (2) - 6 December 1989
Puppets - 13 December 1989
Round and Round - 20 December 1989
Picture Show - 10 January 1990
Noises (2) - 17 January 1990
Measuring - 24 January 1990
Air (2) - 31 January 1990
Balancing - 7 February 1990
Alone Again – Naturally - 14 February 1990
Teatime - 21 February 1990
The Dark - 28 February 1990
The Box - 7 March 1990
Up and Down (2) - 14 March 1990

Series 4 (1990-1991)
The Arrival of Jane - 19 September 1990
All Change (2) - 26 September 1990
Friendship - 3 October 1990
Shopping - 10 October 1990
A Change in the Weather - 17 October 1990
Bicycles - 24 October 1990
Waiting for Aunt Jemima - 31 October 1990
Patterns - 7 November 1990
The Little Red Car - 14 November 1990
Passing the Time - 21 November 1990
Once Upon a Time - 28 November 1990
The Locked Door - 5 December 1990
Cooking - 12 December 1990
It's Magic - 19 December 1990
A Bad Monday - 9 January 1991
Noises (3) - 16 January 1991
The First Day - 23 January 1991
Fun with Language - 30 January 1991
Weight - 6 February 1991
Dressing Up - 13 February 1991
Jane's Birthday - 20 February 1991
Bricks - 27 February 1991
Going to Bed - 6 March 1991
Clearing Up - 13 March 1991
The Garden - 20 March 1991
The Canvas Bag - 27 March 1991

Series 5 (1991-1992)
Bonzo's Olympics - 16 October 1991
Money - 23 October 1991
Noises (4) - 30 October 1991
Inventions - 6 November 1991
Names - 13 November 1991
City Farm - 20 November 1991
Rainy Day - 27 November 1991
Moods - 4 December 1991
Home and Away - 11 December 1991
Clothes (2) - 18 December 1991
Shapes - 8 January 1992
Monsters - 15 January 1992
Playing Tricks - 22 January 1992
Holiday - 29 January 1992
Camping (2) - 5 February 1992
Panic - 12 February 1992
Being Ill - 19 February 1992
Food - 26 February 1992

Series 6 (1993)
Episode 601 - 6 January 1993
Episode 602 - 13 January 1993
Episode 603 - 20 January 1993
Episode 604 - 27 January 1993
Episode 605 - 3 February 1993
Episode 606 - 10 February 1993
Episode 607 - 17 February 1993
Episode 608 - 24 February 1993
Episode 609 - 3 March 1993
Episode 610 - 10 March 1993
Episode 611 - 17 March 1993
Episode 612 - 24 March 1993
Episode 613 - 31 March 1993
Episode 614 - 7 April 1993
Episode 615 - 14 April 1993
Episode 616 - 21 April 1993
Episode 617 - 28 April 1993
Episode 618 - 5 May 1993

Series 7 (1994)
Episode 701 - 6 January 1994
Episode 702 - 13 January 1994
Episode 703 - 20 January 1994
Episode 704 - 27 January 1994
Episode 705 - 3 February 1994
Episode 706 - 10 February 1994
Episode 707 - 17 February 1994
Episode 708 - 24 February 1994
Episode 709 - 3 March 1994
Episode 710 - 10 March 1994

Series 8 (1994)
Episode 801 - 6 September 1994
Episode 802 - 13 September 1994
Episode 803 - 20 September 1994
Episode 804 - 27 September 1994
Episode 805 - 4 October 1994
Episode 806 - 11 October 1994
Episode 807 - 18 October 1994
Episode 808 - 25 October 1994
Bath time Blues - 1 November 1994
Episode 810 - 8 November 1994
Three Billy Goats Gruff - 15 November 1994
Episode 812 - 22 November 1994
Episode 813 - 29 November 1994
Episode 814 - 6 December 1994
Episode 815 - 13 December 1994

Series 9 (1995)
The Visitor  - 12 September 1995
Episode 802  - 19 September 1995
Episode 803 - 26 September 1995
Episode 804 - 3 October 1995
Episode 805 - 10 October 1995
Episode 806 - 17 October 1995
Episode 807 - 24 October 1995
Episode 808 - 31 October 1995
Episode 809 - 7 November 1995
Episode 810 - 14 November 1995
Episode 811 - 21 November 1995
Episode 812 - 28 November 1995
Episode 813 - 5 December 1995
Episode 814 - 12 December 1995

UK VHS Releases
 "A bumper box of Allsorts" released 1994
 "Allsorts of fun..." released 1995

External links
 UK Popular and forgotten kids T.V shows 1980s–2010s, IMDB

1987 British television series debuts
1995 British television series endings
1980s British children's television series
1990s British children's television series
ITV children's television shows
British children's musical television series
British preschool education television series
British television shows featuring puppetry
Television series by ITV Studios
English-language television shows
Television shows produced by Granada Television